Old Batesburg-Leesville High School, also known as Batesburg-Leesville Middle School, was an historic high school building located in Batesburg-Leesville, Lexington County, South Carolina. It was built in 1921, and is a two-story, red brick school building on a raised basement in the Tudor Gothic Revival style. It features a low parapet roof banded in concrete, flanking pavilions, and a Tudor arched entranceway.

It was listed on the National Register of Historic Places in 1982.

The building was demolished in August 2017 due to vandalism on property, asbestos, and plumbing issues.

References

School buildings on the National Register of Historic Places in South Carolina
Tudor Revival architecture in South Carolina
School buildings completed in 1921
Schools in Lexington County, South Carolina
National Register of Historic Places in Lexington County, South Carolina
Buildings and structures demolished in 2017
Demolished buildings and structures in South Carolina
1921 establishments in South Carolina